
Year 909 (CMIX) was a common year starting on Sunday (link will display the full calendar) of the Julian calendar.

Events 
 By place 

 Britain 
 King Edward the Elder and his sister, Princess Æthelflæd of Mercia, raid Danish East Anglia and bring back the relics of St. Oswald in triumph. Æthelflæd translates them to the new minster in Gloucester, which is renamed St. Oswald's Priory in his honour.
 Edward the Elder despatches an Anglo-Saxon army to attack the Northumbrian Vikings and ravages Scandinavian York.

 Africa 
 March 18 – The Fatimid Dynasty founded by Shiite Muslims in Ifriqiya (modern Tunisia) gains suzerainty over the Aghlabid Dynasty in North Africa. Emir Ziyadat Allah III escapes to the Near East, unable to secure any help from the Abbasid Caliphate to regain his emirate.
 The Berber Kutama tribesmen under Abdullah al-Mahdi Billah capture the cities of Kairouan and Raqqada. The capital city of the Rustamid imamate, Tihert is destroyed. The remaining Ibadi are forced into the desert.
 Winter – Abdullah al-Mahdi Billah takes up the leadership of the Fatimid state and proclaims himself Caliph Abdullah (al-Mahdi).  

 China 
 April 27 – The Min Kingdom  (modern-day Fujian province) is established by governor Wang Shenzhi (Prince of Langye), with Fuzhou (known as Changle) as its capital. Wang Shenzhi tries to attract scholars who will help to construct an efficient bureaucracy and tax system.
 Battle of Jisu - the warlord brothers Liu Shouguang and Liu Shouwen fight with Liu Shouguang emerging victorious 

 Mesoamerica 
 The last Long Count date is inscribed on a monument at the Mayan site of Toniná (modern-day Chiapas, Mexico), marking the end of the Classic Maya Period. 

 By topic 
 Religion 
 Asser, bishop of Sherborne, dies. His See is divided, there are new Bishoprics created at Wells, Crediton, Ramsbury and Sonning.

Births 
 Æthelwold, bishop of Winchester (or 904)
 December – Ar-Radi, Abbasid caliph (d. 940)
 Dunstan, archbishop of Canterbury (d. 988)
 Fujiwara no Morosuke, Japanese statesman (d. 960)
 Shen Lun, Chinese scholar-official (d. 987)

Deaths 
 April 18 – Dionysius II, Syriac Orthodox patriarch of Antioch
 May 9 – Adalgar, archbishop of Bremen
 Aribo of Austria, Frankish margrave
 Asser, bishop of Sherborne (approximate date)
 Cadell ap Rhodri, king of Seisyllwg (Wales)
 Cerball mac Muirecáin, king of Leinster (Ireland)
 Fujiwara no Tokihira, Japanese statesman (b. 871)
 Gerald of Aurillac, Frankish nobleman (b. 855)
 Luo Yin, Chinese statesman and poet (b. 833)
 Muhammad ibn Dawud al-Zahiri, Muslim theologian (b. 868) 
 Sochlachan mac Diarmata, king of Uí Maine (Ireland)
 Wighelm, bishop of Selsey

References